Frostman Glacier is a broad, low gradient glacier discharging into the south side of Hull Bay just west of the Konter Cliffs, on the coast of Marie Byrd Land, Antarctica. It was mapped by the United States Geological Survey from surveys and U.S. Navy air photos, 1959–65, and was named by the Advisory Committee on Antarctic Names for Thomas O. Frostman, a meteorologist at Plateau Station, 1968.

References

Glaciers of Marie Byrd Land